Elections in the Republic of India in 1969 included elections to six state legislative assemblies and to seats in the Rajya Sabha.

Legislative Assembly elections
1969 elections in India

Bihar

Nagaland

Pondicherry

Punjab

Uttar Pradesh

West Bengal

Rajya Sabha

References

External Links

 

1969 elections in India
India
1969 in India
Elections in India by year